Walter Vincent (15 April 1631 – c. July 1680) was an English politician who sat in the House of Commons  at various times between 1656 and 1680.

Vincent was the son of Henry Vincent, a lawyer and his wife Elizabeth. His father was an attorney of Truro and Vincent also became  a thriving lawyer living at Truro in Cornwall. In 1656, he was elected Member of Parliament for Truro in the Second Protectorate Parliament. He was re-elected MP for Truro in the Third Protectorate Parliament in 1659. In 1660, Vincent was elected MP for Truro again in the Convention Parliament. In 1667 he purchased the manor of Trelevan. He was elected MP  for Mitchell in 1679.

Vincent was appointed a Baron of the Exchequer in 1680. He died on his journey to London, before he had chance to be sworn in at the age of  49.

Vincent married Jane Nosworthy and had sons Walter and Henry who were also in parliament.

References

1631 births
1680 deaths
Members of the pre-1707 English Parliament for constituencies in Cornwall
English MPs 1656–1658
English MPs 1659
English MPs 1660
English MPs 1679